Tri-Eastern Conference titles during the winter season.

Boys' TEC Basketball Titles

Boys' Sectional Basketball Titles

Boys' Regional, Semi-State, State Basketball Titles

Girls' TEC Basketball Titles

Girls' Sectional Basketball Titles

Girls' Regional, Semi-State, State Basketball Titles

Wrestling TEC Titles

Wrestling Sectional Titles

Wrestling Regional, Semi-State, State Titles

Wrestling Individual State Titles

Sources 
T.E.C. Boys Champions
T.E.C. Girls Champions

High school sports conferences and leagues in the United States
Indiana High School Athletic Association